A spindle (or colloquially, a spike) is an upright spike used to temporarily hold papers.  "Spindling" or "spiking" is the act of spearing an item onto the spike.  A spindle was often used in restaurants to hold orders from the waitstaff to the kitchen.

Depending on what sort of records were on a spindle, a string could be put through the holes to bundle the papers together, and the bundle stored.

The journalistic term to "spike" an article refers to one that ends up spindled on an editor's desk rather than forwarded for publication, typically for reasons other than mere copyedits.

Spindling was the middle of three stern prohibitions in the famous injunction historically printed on punched card documents to be processed by computer: "Do not fold, spindle, or mutilate".

References

Office equipment
Stationery